In Western esotericism, left-hand path and right-hand path are two opposing approaches to magic. This terminology is used by various groups involved in the occult and ceremonial magic. In some definitions, the left-hand path is equated with malicious black magic, while the right-hand path is equated with benevolent white magic. Other occultists have criticised this definition, believing that the left–right dichotomy refers merely to different kinds of working and does not necessarily connote good or bad magical actions. Other practitioners state the difference between the two is that the desired outcome of the right is to be beside God and to serve him, while the left believe in self deification and bow to no one.

In more recent definitions, which base themselves on the terms' origins in Indian tantra, the right-hand path (RHP, or dakṣiṇācāra), is seen as a definition for those magical groups that follow specific ethical codes and adopt social convention, while the left-hand path (LHP, or vamamarga) adopts the opposite attitude, espousing the breaking of taboo and the abandoning of set morality. Some contemporary occultists, such as Peter J. Carroll, have stressed that both paths can be followed by a magical practitioner, as essentially they have the same goals.

Another distinguishing characteristic separating the two is based upon the aim of the practitioner. Right-handed path practitioners tend to work towards ascending their soul towards ultimate union (or reunion) with the divine source, returning to heaven, allegorically alluded to as restoration or climbing back up the ladder after the "great fall". In Solomon's lesser key, they embrace the light and try to annihilate anything they regard as "dark" or "evil". On the other hand, left-handed path practitioners do not see this as the ultimate aim but a step towards their goal. Left-handed path practitioners embrace the dark as well as the light in order to invoke the alchemical formula solve et coagula ("dissolve and precipitate"), confronting the negative in order to transmute it into desirable qualities. Left-handed path practitioners descend towards union with the divine to obtain godhood status, with godlike powers of their own, having reunited with the ultimate divine source-energy; then once there, taking one more step separating from that divinity, out of this creation into a new creation of their own making, with themselves as the sole divinity of the new universe, apart from the previous creation. The godhood self sought by left-hand path followers is represented by the Qlipha Thaumiel in the Tree of Knowledge.

Terminology

Right-hand path 
The right-hand path is commonly thought to refer to magical or religious groups which adhere to a certain set of characteristics:
 They divide the concepts of mind, body and spirit into three separate, albeit interrelated, entities.
 They adhere to a specific moral code and a belief in some form of judgement, such as karma or the Threefold Law.

The occultist Dion Fortune considered Abrahamic religions to be RHP.

Left-hand path 
The historian Dave Evans studied self-professed followers of the left-hand path in the early 21st century, making several observations about their practices:
They often reject societal convention and the status quo, which some suggest is in a search for spiritual freedom. As a part of this, LHP followers embrace magical techniques that would traditionally be viewed as taboo, for instance using sex magic or embracing Satanic imagery. As Mogg Morgan wrote, the "breaking of taboos makes magic more potent and can lead to reintegration and liberation, [for example] the eating of meat in a vegetarian community can have the same liberating effect as anal intercourse in a sexually inhibited society."
 They often question religious or moral dogma, instead adhering to forms of personal anarchism.
 They often embrace sexuality and incorporate it into magical ritual.

History of the terms

Tantra and Madame Blavatsky 
Vāmācāra is a Sanskrit term meaning "left-handed attainment". The converse term is dakshinachara. The Western use of the terms left-hand path and right-hand path originated with Madame Blavatsky, a 19th-century occultist who founded the Theosophical Society. She had travelled across parts of southern Asia and gave accounts of having met with many mystics and magical practitioners in India and Tibet. She developed the term left-hand path as a translation of the term vamachara, an Indian Tantric practice that emphasised the breaking of Hindu societal taboos by having sexual intercourse in ritual, drinking alcohol, eating meat and assembling in graveyards, as a part of the spiritual practice. The term vamachara literally meant "the left-hand way" in Sanskrit, and it was from this that Blavatsky first coined the term.

Returning to Europe, Blavatsky began using the term. It was relatively easy for her to associate left with evil in many European countries, where it already has had an association with evil and bad luck since the Classical Latin era.  As the historian Dave Evans noted, homosexuals were referred to as "left-handed", and while in Protestant nations Roman Catholics were called "left-footers".

Adoption into the western esoteric tradition 
In New York, Madame Blavatsky founded the Theosophical Society with several other people in 1875. She set about writing several books, including Isis Unveiled (1877) in which she introduced the terms left-hand path and right-hand path, firmly stating that she herself followed the RHP, and that followers of the LHP were practitioners of black magic who were a threat to society. The occult community soon picked up on her newly introduced duality, which, according to historian Dave Evans, "had not been known before" in the Western Esoteric Tradition. For instance, Dion Fortune, the founder of an esoteric magical group (the Society of the Inner Light) also took the side of the RHP, making the claim that "black magicians", or followers of the LHP, were homosexuals and that Indian servants might use malicious magical rites devoted to the goddess Kali against their European masters.

Aleister Crowley further altered and popularized the term in certain occult circles, referring to a "brother of the left-hand path", or a "black brother", as one who failed to attain the grade of Magister Templi in Crowley's system of ceremonial magic. Crowley also referred to the left-hand path when describing the point at which the Adeptus Exemptus (such as his old Christian mentor, MacGregor Mathers) chooses to cross the Abyss, which is the location of Choronzon and the illusory eleventh Sephira, which is Da'ath or Knowledge. In this example, the adept must surrender all, including the guidance of his Holy Guardian Angel, and leap into the Abyss. If his accumulated Karma is sufficient, and if he has been utterly thorough in his own self-destruction, he becomes a "babe of the abyss", arising as a Star in the Crowleyan system. On the other hand, if he retains some fragment of ego, or if he fears to cross, he then becomes encysted. The layers of his self, which he could have shed in the Abyss, ossify around him. He is then titled a "brother of the left-hand path", who will eventually be broken up and disintegrated against his will, since he failed to choose voluntary disintegration. Crowley associated all this with "Mary, a blasphemy against Babalon", and with the celibacy of Christian clergy.

Another of those figures that Fortune considered to be a follower of the LHP was Arthur Edward Waite, who did not recognise these terms, and acknowledged that they were newly introduced and that in any case he believed the terms LHP and RHP to be distinct from black and white magic. However, despite Waite's attempts to distinguish the two, the equation of the LHP with Black Magic was propagated more widely in the fiction of Dennis Wheatley; Wheatley also conflated the two with Satanism and also the political ideology of communism, which he viewed as a threat to traditional British society. In one of his novels, Strange Conflict (1941), he stated that:

The Order of the Left-Hand Path... has its adepts... the Way of Darkness is perpetuated in the horrible Voodoo cult which had its origins in Madagascar and has held Africa, the Dark Continent, in its grip for centuries.

Later 20th and 21st centuries
In the latter half of the 20th century various groups arose that self-professedly described themselves as LHP, but did not consider themselves as following Black Magic. In 1975, Kenneth Grant, a student of Aleister Crowley, explained in Cults of the Shadow that he and his group, the Typhonian Order, practiced the LHP. Grant's usage takes meaning from its roots in eastern Tantra; Grant states that it is about challenging taboos, but that it should be used in conjunction with the RHP to achieve balance.

While Anton Szandor LaVey developed his form of Satanism during the 1960s, he emphasized the rejection of traditional Christian morality, and explicitly labelled his new philosophy a form of the left-hand path. In The Satanic Bible LaVey wrote that "Satanism is not a white light religion; it is a religion of the flesh, the mundane, the carnal—all of which are ruled by Satan, the personification of the left-hand path."

Stephen E. Flowers of the Temple of Set writes of two criteria to be considered a true Lord of the Left-Hand Path: self-deification and antinomianism.

See also

References

Works cited

Further reading

External link

 
Dichotomies